The 1981–82 NBA season was the 36th season of the National Basketball Association. The season ended with the Los Angeles Lakers winning the NBA Championship, beating the Philadelphia 76ers 4 games to 2 in the NBA Finals.

Notable occurrences

The regular-season ran until mid to late-April for the first time.
The 1982 NBA All-Star Game was played at the new Brendan Byrne Arena (now the Meadowlands Arena) in East Rutherford, New Jersey, with the East defeating the West 120–118. Larry Bird of the Boston Celtics wins the game's MVP award. This season also marked the New Jersey Nets first season in the new arena.
On March 6, 1982, San Antonio beat Milwaukee 171–166 in three overtime periods to set the record for most points by two teams in a game. The record was broken two seasons later.
Magic Johnson secures his second NBA Finals MVP award several months before his 23rd birthday.
The Los Angeles Lakers begin a string of nine consecutive seasons as the No. 1 seed in the Western Conference.
The Denver Nuggets scored at least 100 points in every single game of the season, while also allowing 100 points in every game. It remains the only time this has occurred in NBA history.
After a few years of success in NCAA basketball, the breakaway rim became standardized equipment in the NBA.
This season marked Isiah Thomas' rookie season.
The three-to-make-two free throw rule, along with the two-to-make one rule (both used when a team exceeded five team fouls in a quarter), were both eliminated.
This season marked Bob Dandridge's final season.

Final standings

By division

By conference

Notes
z – Clinched home court advantage for the entire playoffs and first round bye
c – Clinched home court advantage for the conference playoffs and first round bye
y – Clinched division title and first round bye
x – Clinched playoff spot

Playoffs
Teams in bold advanced to the next round. The numbers to the left of each team indicate the team's seeding in its conference, and the numbers to the right indicate the number of games the team won in that round. The division champions are marked by an asterisk. Home court advantage does not necessarily belong to the higher-seeded team, but instead the team with the better regular season record; teams enjoying the home advantage are shown in italics.

Statistics leaders

NBA awards
Most Valuable Player: Moses Malone, Houston Rockets
Rookie of the Year: Buck Williams, New Jersey Nets
Coach of the Year: Gene Shue, Washington Bullets

All-NBA First Team:
F – Larry Bird, Boston Celtics
F – Julius Erving, Philadelphia 76ers
C – Moses Malone, Houston Rockets
G – George Gervin, San Antonio Spurs
G – Gus Williams, Seattle SuperSonics

All-NBA Second Team:
F – Alex English, Denver Nuggets
F – Bernard King, Golden State Warriors
C – Robert Parish, Boston Celtics
G – Magic Johnson, Los Angeles Lakers
G – Sidney Moncrief, Milwaukee Bucks

All-NBA Rookie Team:
Buck Williams, New Jersey Nets
Jay Vincent, Dallas Mavericks
Kelly Tripucka, Detroit Pistons
Isiah Thomas, Detroit Pistons
Jeff Ruland, Washington Bullets

NBA All-Defensive First Team:
Bobby Jones, Philadelphia 76ers
Caldwell Jones, Philadelphia 76ers
Michael Cooper, Los Angeles Lakers
Dennis Johnson, Phoenix Suns
Dan Roundfield, Atlanta Hawks

NBA All-Defensive Second Team:
Larry Bird, Boston Celtics
Quinn Buckner, Milwaukee Bucks
Lonnie Shelton, Seattle SuperSonics
Sidney Moncrief, Milwaukee Bucks
Jack Sikma, Seattle SuperSonics

References